Melbourne City Football Club is an association football club based in Bundoora, Melbourne. The club was formed in 2009 as Melbourne Heart before it was renamed to Melbourne City. They became the second Victorian member admitted into the A-League in 2005.

Melbourne City entered the A-League in the 2010–11 season, following the club's formation in 2009. The club was for its four seasons called Melbourne Heart FC, though ahead of the 2014–15 season it was bought by the City Football Group and rebranded Melbourne City FC.

As of the end of the 2019–20 season, the club's first team have spent ten seasons in the top division Australian soccer. Their worst league finish to date is 10th in the A-League, their placing at the end of the 2013–14. The table details the club's achievements in major competitions, and the top scorers for each season. The club's longest period without a competitive honour is seven years, between the 2010–11 and 2016–17 seasons. Jamie Maclaren holds the record for most competitive goals in a single season for Melbourne City; he scored 29 during the 2019–20 campaign. The table details the club's achievements in major competitions, and the top scorers for each season.

Key
Key to league competitions:

 A-League Men (A-League) – Australia's top soccer league, established in 2005

Key to colours and symbols:

Key to league record:
 Season = The year and article of the season
 Pos = Final position
 Pld = Games played
 W = Games won
 D = Games drawn
 L = Games lost
 GF = Goals scored
 GA = Goals against
 Pts = Points

Key to cup record:
 En-dash (–) = Melbourne City did not participate or cup not held
 DNQ = Did not qualify
 DNE = The club did not enter cup play
 Group = Group stage
 R32 = Round of 32
 R16 = Round of 16
 QF = Quarter-finals
 SF = Semi-finals
 RU = Runners-up
 W = Winners

Seasons

Footnotes

References

External links
 Ultimate A-League
 A-League Stats

Seasons
 
Australian soccer club seasons
Melbourne sport-related lists